Madeleine Beth McCann (born 12 May 2003) is a British missing person who disappeared from her bed in a holiday apartment in Praia da Luz, Portugal, on the evening of 3 May 2007, at the age of 3. The Daily Telegraph described the disappearance as "the most heavily reported missing-person case in modern history". Madeleine's whereabouts remain unknown, although German prosecutors believe she is dead.

Madeleine was on holiday from the United Kingdom with her parents, Kate and Gerry McCann; her two-year-old twin siblings; and a group of family friends and their children. The McCann children had been left asleep at 20:30 in the ground-floor apartment, while their parents dined with friends in a restaurant 55 metres (180 ft) away. The parents checked on the children throughout the evening, until Kate discovered Madeleine was missing at 22:00. Over the following weeks, particularly after misinterpreting a British DNA analysis, the Portuguese police came to believe that Madeleine had died in an accident in the apartment and that her parents had covered it up. The McCanns were given arguido (suspect) status in September 2007, which was lifted when Portugal's attorney general archived the case in July 2008 for lack of evidence.

Madeleine's parents continued the investigation using private detectives until Scotland Yard opened its own inquiry, Operation Grange, in 2011. The senior investigating officer announced that he was treating the disappearance as "a criminal act by a stranger", most likely a planned abduction or burglary gone wrong. In 2013, Scotland Yard released e-fit images of men they wanted to trace, including one of a man seen carrying a child toward the beach on the night Madeleine vanished. Shortly after this, Portuguese police reopened their inquiry. Operation Grange was scaled back in 2015, but the remaining detectives continued to pursue a small number of inquiries described in April 2017 as significant. 

In 2020, police in the German city of Braunschweig stated there was a new suspect in Madeleine's disappearance, whom public prosecutor Hans Christian Wolters was convinced had abducted and murdered the child.

Madeleine's disappearance attracted sustained international interest and saturation coverage in the UK, reminiscent of the death of Princess Diana in 1997. Her parents were subjected to intense scrutiny and baseless allegations of involvement in their daughter's death, particularly in the tabloid press and on Twitter. In 2008 they and their travelling companions received damages and apologies from Express Newspapers, and in 2011 the McCanns testified before the Leveson Inquiry into British press misconduct, lending support to those arguing for tighter press regulation.

People

Madeleine McCann

Madeleine McCann was born in Leicester and lived with her family in Rothley, Leicestershire. At her parents' request, she was made a ward of court in England shortly after the disappearance, which gave the court statutory powers to act on her behalf. Police described Madeleine as blonde-haired, with blue-green eyes, a small brown spot on her left calf, and a distinctive dark strip on the iris of her right eye. In 2009 the McCanns released age-progressed images of how she may have looked at age six, and in 2012 Scotland Yard commissioned one of her at age nine.

Kate and Gerry McCann
Madeleine's parents are both physicians and practising Roman Catholics. Kate Marie McCann, née Healy (born 1968, Huyton, near Liverpool) attended All Saints School in Anfield, then Notre Dame High School in Everton Valley, graduating in 1992 with a degree in medicine from the University of Dundee. She moved briefly into obstetrics and gynaecology, then anaesthetics, and finally general practice.

Gerald Patrick McCann (born 1968 in Glasgow) attended Holyrood R.C. Secondary School before graduating from the University of Glasgow with a BSc in physiology/sports science in 1989. In 1992, he qualified in medicine and in 2002 obtained his MD, also from Glasgow. Since 2005, he has been a consultant cardiologist at Glenfield Hospital, Leicester. The McCanns met in 1993 in Glasgow and were married in 1998. Madeleine was born in 2003 and the twins, a boy and girl, in 2005.

Tapas Seven
The McCanns were on holiday with seven friends and eight children in all, including the McCanns' three. The nine adults dined together most evenings at 20:30 in the resort's tapas restaurant, as a result of which the media dubbed the friends the "Tapas Seven". The Tapas Seven included Fiona and David Payne, both physicians; their two children; and Fiona's mother, Dianne Webster. The McCanns had known the Paynes for years; Kate had met Fiona in 2000 when they both worked in Leicester General Hospital's intensive care unit. 

Accompanying them were two couples the Paynes had originally introduced to the McCanns: Jane Tanner, a marketing manager, and her partner, Russell O'Brien, a physician, who were on holiday with their two children; and Matthew Oldfield, another physician, who was with his wife, Rachael Oldfield, a lawyer, and their daughter. Gerry, Russell and Matthew had worked together over the years. The "Tanner sighting"—Jane Tanner's report that she saw a man carry a child away from the resort 45 minutes before Madeleine was reported missing—became one of the most-discussed aspects of the case.

5A Rua Dr Agostinho da Silva, Praia da Luz
The McCanns arrived on 28 April 2007 for their seven-night spring break in Praia da Luz, a village in Portugal's Algarve region with a population of 1,000, known as "Little Britain" because of the concentration of British homeowners and holidaymakers. They had booked through the British holiday company Mark Warner Ltd, and were placed in 5A Rua Dr Agostinho da Silva, an apartment owned by a retired teacher from Liverpool, one of several privately owned properties rented by the company.

5A was a two-bedroom, ground-floor apartment in the fifth block of a group of apartments known as Waterside Village, which lay on the perimeter of part of Mark Warner's Ocean Club resort. Matthew and Rachel Oldfield were next door in 5B, Jane Tanner and Russell O'Brien in 5D, and the Paynes and Dianne Webster on the first floor. Located on the corner of Rua Dr Agostinho da Silva and Rua Dr Francisco Gentil Martins, 5A was accessible to the public from two sides. Sliding glass patio doors in the living room at the back overlooked the Ocean Club's pool, tennis courts, tapas restaurant and bar. The patio doors could be accessed via a public street, Rua Dr Francisco Gentil Martins, where a small gate and set of steps led to 5A's balcony and living room. 5A's front door was on the opposite side of the block from the Ocean Club, on Rua Dr Agostinho da Silva.

The McCanns' children slept in a bedroom next to the front door, which the McCanns kept locked. The bedroom had one, waist-high window with curtains and a metal exterior shutter, the latter controlled by a cord inside the window; the McCanns kept the curtains and shutter closed throughout the holiday. The window overlooked a narrow walkway and residents' car park, which was separated from the street by a low wall. Madeleine slept in a single bed next to the bedroom door, on the opposite side of the room from the window, while the twins were in travel cots in the middle of the room. There was another single bed underneath the window.

Thursday, 3 May 2007

Daytime: McCann family activities 
Thursday, 3 May, was the penultimate day of the family's holiday. Over breakfast Madeleine asked: "Why didn't you come when [my brother] and I cried last night?" After the disappearance, her parents wondered whether this meant someone had entered the children's bedroom. Her mother also noticed a large brown stain on Madeleine's pyjama top.

The children spent the morning in the resort's Kids' Club, then the family lunched at their apartment before heading to the pool. Kate took the last known photograph of Madeleine at 2:29 that afternoon, sitting by the pool next to her father and two-year-old sister. The children returned to the Kids' Club, then at 18:00 their mother took them back to 5A, while their father went for a tennis lesson. The McCanns put the children to bed at around 19:00. Madeleine was left asleep in short-sleeved, pink-and-white Marks and Spencer's Eeyore pyjamas, next to her comfort blanket and a soft toy, Cuddle Cat.

20:30: Tapas restaurant 
At 20:30 the parents left 5A to dine with their friends in the Ocean Club's open-air tapas restaurant, located on the other side of the pool. 5A lay about 55 metres (180 ft) from the restaurant as the crow flies, but getting to the restaurant involved walking along a public street to reach the doors of the Ocean Club resort, then walking through the resort to the other side of the pool, a distance of about 82 metres (295 ft). The top of the apartment was visible from the tapas restaurant, but not the doors. The patio doors could be locked only from the inside, so the McCanns left them closed but unlocked, with the curtains drawn, so they could let themselves in that way when checking on the children. There was a child-safety gate at the top of the steps from the patio and a low gate at the bottom, which led to the street.

The resort's staff had left a note in a message book at the swimming-pool reception area, asking that the same table, which overlooked the apartments, be block-booked for 20:30 for the McCanns and friends every evening for the last four evenings of the holiday. The message said the group's children were asleep in the apartments. Kate believes the abductor may have seen the note. The McCanns and their friends left the restaurant roughly every half-hour to check on their children. Gerry carried out the first check on 5A at around 21:05. The children were asleep and all was well, except that he recalled having left the children's bedroom door slightly ajar, and now it stood almost wide open. He pulled it nearly closed again before returning to the restaurant.

21:15: Tanner sighting

The sighting by Jane Tanner, one of the Tapas Seven, of a man carrying a child that night became an important part of the early investigation. Tanner had left the restaurant just after 21:00 to check on her own daughter, passing Gerry on Rua Dr Francisco Gentil Martins on his way back to the restaurant from his 21:05 check. He had stopped to chat to a British holidaymaker, but neither man recalled having seen Tanner. This puzzled the Portuguese police, given how narrow the street was, and led them to accuse Tanner of having invented the sighting.

Tanner told the police that at around 21:15 she had noticed a man carrying a young child walk across the junction of Rua Dr Francisco Gentil Martins and Rua Dr Agostinho da Silva just ahead of her. He was not far from Madeleine's bedroom, heading east, away from the front of apartment 5A. In the early days of the investigation, the direction in which he was walking was thought to be important because he was moving toward the home of Robert Murat, the 33-year-old British-Portuguese man who lived near 5A, and who became the case's first suspect.

The child in the man's arms was wearing light-coloured pink pyjamas with a floral pattern and cuffs on the legs, similar to Madeleine's. Tanner described the man as white, dark-haired, 5 ft 7 in (1.70 m) tall, of southern European or Mediterranean appearance, 35–40 years old, wearing gold or beige trousers and a dark jacket, and said he did not look like a tourist. According to Kate, Tanner passed the information to Portuguese police as soon as Madeleine was reported missing, but they did not pass the description to the media until 25 May. Madeleine's Fund hired a forensic artist to create an image of the man, which was released in October 2007.

The sighting became important because it offered investigators a time frame for the abduction, but Scotland Yard came to view it as a red herring. In October 2013, they said that a British holidaymaker had been identified as the man Tanner had seen; he had been returning to his apartment after collecting his daughter from the Ocean Club night creche. Scotland Yard took photographs of the man wearing the same or similar clothes to the ones he was wearing on the night, and standing in a pose similar to the one Tanner reported. The pyjamas his daughter had been wearing also matched Tanner's report. Operation Grange's lead detective, Detective Chief Inspector Andy Redwood, said they were "almost certain" the Tanner sighting was not related to the abduction.

22:00: Smith sighting

The rejection of the Tanner sighting as crucial to the timeline allowed investigators to focus on another sighting of a man carrying a child on the night of Madeleine's disappearance, this one reported to Portuguese police on 26 May 2007 by Martin and Mary Smith, who had been in Praia da Luz on holiday from Ireland. Scotland Yard concluded in 2013 that the Smith sighting offered the approximate time of Madeleine's kidnap.

The Smiths saw the man at around 22:00 on Rua da Escola Primária,  from the McCanns' apartment, walking away from the Ocean Club and toward Rua 25 de Abril and the beach. He was carrying a girl aged 3–4 years. She had blonde hair and pale skin, was wearing light-coloured pyjamas, and had bare feet. The man was mid-30s, 5 ft 7 in–5 ft 9 in (1.75–1.80 m), slim-to-normal build, with short brown hair, wearing cream or beige trousers. He did not look like a tourist, according to the Smiths, and had seemed uncomfortable carrying the child. E-fits based on the Smiths' testimony were first created in 2008 by Oakley International, private investigators hired by the McCanns, and were publicized in 2013 by Scotland Yard on the BBC programme Crimewatch.

22:00: Reported missing
Kate had intended to check on the children at 21:30, but Matthew Oldfield, one of the Tapas Seven, offered to do it when he checked on his own children in the apartment next door to 5A. He noticed that the McCanns' children's bedroom door was wide open, but after hearing no noise, he left 5A without looking far enough into the bedroom to see whether Madeleine was there. He could not recall whether the bedroom window and its exterior shutter were open at this point. Early on in the investigation, Portuguese police accused Oldfield of involvement because he had volunteered to do the check, suggesting to them that he had handed Madeleine to someone through the bedroom window.

Kate made her own check of 5A at around 22:00. Scotland Yard stated in 2013 that Madeleine was probably taken moments before this. Kate recalled entering the apartment through the unlocked patio doors at the back and noticing that the children's bedroom door was wide open. When she tried to close the door, it slammed shut as though there was a draught, which is when she saw that the bedroom window and its shutter were open. Madeleine's Cuddle Cat and blanket were still on the bed, but Madeleine was gone. After briefly searching the apartment, Kate ran back towards the restaurant, screaming, "Madeleine's gone! Someone's taken her!"

At around 22:10, Gerry sent Matthew Oldfield to ask the resort's reception desk to call the police, and at 22:30 the resort activated its missing-child search protocol. Sixty staff and guests searched until 04:30, at first assuming that Madeleine had wandered off. One of them told Channel 4's Dispatches that, from one end of Praia da Luz to the other, searchers calling Madeleine's name could be heard.

Early response

Portuguese police
Two officers from the gendarmerie, the Guarda Nacional Republicana (GNR), arrived at the resort at 23:10 from Lagos, 5 miles (8 km) away. At midnight, after briefly searching, they alerted the criminal police, the Polícia Judiciária (PJ), in nearby Portimão. Kate recounted that the PJ arrived just after 01:00. According to the PJ, they arrived within 10 minutes of being alerted. At 02:00 two patrol dogs were brought to the resort, and at 08:00 four search and rescue dogs. Police officers had their leave cancelled and started searching waterways, wells, caves, sewers and ruins around Praia da Luz. Inspector Gonçalo Amaral, head of the PJ in Portimão, became the inquiry's coordinator.

It was widely acknowledged that mistakes were made during the so-called "golden hours" soon after the disappearance. Neither border nor marine police were given descriptions of Madeleine for many hours, and officers did not make house-to-house searches. According to Kate, roadblocks were first put in place at 10:00 the next morning. Police did not request motorway surveillance pictures of vehicles leaving Praia da Luz the night of the disappearance, or of the road between Lagos and Vila Real de Santo António on the Spanish border. Euroscut, the company that monitors the road, said they were not approached for information. It took Interpol five days to issue a global missing-person alert. Not everyone in the resort at the time was interviewed; holidaymakers later contacted the British police to say no one had spoken to them. 

The crime scene was not secured. Portuguese police took samples from Madeleine's bedroom, which were sent to three forensic labs. It was reported on 1 June 2007 that DNA from one "stranger" had been found, but around twenty people had entered apartment 5A before it was closed off, according to Chief Inspector Olegário de Sousa of the PJ. According to Kate, an officer placed tape across the doorway of the children's bedroom, but left at 03:00 without securing the apartment. The PJ case file, released in 2008, showed that 5A lay empty for a month after the disappearance, then was let out to tourists before being sealed off in August 2007 for more forensic tests. A similar situation arose outside the apartment when a crowd gathered by the front door of 5A, including next to the children's bedroom window—through which an abductor may have entered or left—trampling on evidence. An officer dusted the bedroom window's exterior shutter for fingerprints without wearing gloves or other protective clothing.

British police
In the United Kingdom it was agreed that Madeleine's home force, Leicestershire Police—led by Chief Constable Matt Baggott—would coordinate the British response, although it remained a Portuguese inquiry. A strategic coordinating group, or "gold" group, was put together, representing Leicestershire Police, the Serious Organised Crime Agency (SOCA), the Child Exploitation and Online Protection Centre (CEOP), and the National Police Improvement Agency (NPIA). The PJ gave a British team a room in which to work, but apparently resented their presence. British police were used to feeding their data into HOLMES 2 (the Home Office Large Major Enquiry System); in Portugal, the information was collected in boxes. In addition the PJ had less autonomy than police in the UK, often having to wait for magistrates' decisions, which slowed things down. In an interview for Anthony Summers's and Robbyn Swan's book Looking for Madeleine (2014), Jim Gamble, head of CEOP at the time, said Portuguese police felt they were being condescended to, and that the British were acting as a "colonial power".

Media and PR

A PJ officer acknowledged in 2010 that Portuguese police had been suspicious of the McCanns from the start because of the "media circus". Gerry told Vanity Fair in 2008 that he had decided to "market" Madeleine to keep her in the public eye. To that end, a string of public relations consultants arrived in Praia da Luz, deeply resented by the local police, who saw the media attention as counterproductive. Alex Woolfall of the British PR firm Bell Pottinger, representing Mark Warner Ltd, dealt with the media for the first ten days, then the British government sent in press officers. This was apparently unprecedented.

The first government press officer was Sheree Dodd, a former Daily Mirror journalist, who was followed by Clarence Mitchell, director of media monitoring for the Central Office of Information. When the government withdrew Mitchell, the McCanns hired Justine McGuinness, who was reportedly headhunted for the job. When she left, Hanover Communications took over briefly, headed by Charles Lewington, formerly John Major's private secretary. In September 2007, Brian Kennedy of Everest Windows stepped forward as a benefactor and offered to cover Mitchell's salary so that he could return. Mitchell resigned from his government position and started working for the McCanns full-time; he was later paid by Madeleine's Fund.

The McCanns set up Madeleine's Fund: Leaving No Stone Unturned Ltd on 15 May 2007 to raise money and awareness; its website attracted 58 million hits in the first two days. Throughout May and June the couple's PR team arranged events to sustain media interest in the case, including a visit to the Portuguese city of Fátima as well as trips to Holland, Germany, Spain, and Morocco. On 30 May 2007, accompanied by reporters, the couple flew to Rome—in Sir Philip Green's Learjet—to meet Pope Benedict XVI, a visit arranged by Cardinal Cormac Murphy-O'Connor, the Archbishop of Westminster. The following month balloons were let off in 300 cities around the world. 

By early June, journalists were voicing concerns: the "sheer professionalism of it ... troubled journalists", according to Matthew Parris. Placing Madeleine on the front page of a British newspaper would sell up to 30,000 extra copies. She appeared on the cover of People magazine on 28 May 2007, on the front page of several British tabloids every day for almost six months, and as one of Sky News's menu options: "UK News", "Madeleine", "World News". Between May 2007 and July 2008, the Portuguese tabloid Correio da Manhã published 384 articles about Madeleine. By June 2008 a search for her name on YouTube returned over 3,680 videos and seven million posts.

First Portuguese inquiry (2007–2008)

First arguido

Twelve days after Madeleine's disappearance, Robert Murat, a 34-year-old British-Portuguese property consultant, became the first arguido (suspect) in the case. Born in Hammersmith, West London, Murat lived in his mother's house, Casa Liliana, 150 yards (137 m) from apartment 5A in the direction in which the man in the Tanner sighting had walked. He was named a suspect after a Sunday Mirror journalist told Portuguese police he had been asking about the case. The PJ had briefly signed Murat up as an official interpreter; he said he had wanted to help because he had a daughter in England around Madeleine's age.

Three members of the Tapas Seven—Fiona Payne, Russell O'Brien and Rachael Oldfield—said they had seen Murat outside apartment 5A shortly after the disappearance, as did an Ocean Club nanny and two British holidaymakers. This would not have been surprising considering how close Murat lived to 5A, but he and his mother said he had been at home all evening. The McCann circle was clearly suspicious of Murat: one of the McCanns' supporters offered Richard Bilton, a BBC reporter, "exclusive access to any new developments in the case" if Bilton would report back what the press pack was saying about Murat. Beginning on 15 May 2007, Murat's home was searched; the pool drained; his cars, computers, phones and video tapes examined; his garden searched using ground radar and sniffer dogs; and two of his associates questioned. In March 2008, one of those associates had his car set fire to, with the word fala ("speak") sprayed in red on the pavement.

There was nothing to link Murat or his friends to the disappearance, and Murat's arguido status was lifted on 21 July 2008 when the case was archived. In April 2008 he received £600,000 in out-of-court settlements for libel in what The Observer said was the largest number of separate libel actions brought in the UK by the same person in relation to one issue; his friends received £100,000 each. In July 2014, during Operation Grange, one of those friends was questioned again as a witness, this time by the PJ on behalf of Scotland Yard. In December that year Murat and his wife were questioned, also on behalf of Scotland Yard, along with eight others. In 2017 Murat's mother added her voice to those who had witnessed suspicious events around 5A that night: she told the BBC that she had driven past apartment 5A that night and had seen a young woman in a plum-coloured top behaving suspiciously just outside it, information she said she passed to the police at the time. She also said she had seen a small brown rental car speeding toward the apartment, driving the wrong way down a one-way street.

Witness statements
In statements to the PJ, witnesses described men behaving oddly near apartment 5A in the days before the disappearance and on the day itself. Scotland Yard came to believe that these men may have been engaged in reconnaissance for an abduction or burglary. There had been a fourfold increase in burglaries between January and May 2007, including two in the McCanns' block in the seventeen days before the disappearance, during which burglars had entered through windows. 

Several witnesses reported men collecting for charity. On 20 April, a bedraggled-looking man asked a tourist in her apartment near 5A for money for an orphanage in nearby Espiche; apparently there were no orphanages or similar in or near Espiche at the time. The witness described the man as pushy and intimidating. On 25 or 26 April, the tourist who rented apartment 5A before the McCanns found a man on his balcony who had entered via the steps from the street. Polite and clean-shaven, the visitor asked for money for an orphanage. On the day of the disappearance, 3 May, there were four charity collections by two men in the streets around 5A. At 4:00p.m. two black-haired men approached a British homeowner looking for funds for a hostel or hospice in or near Espiche, and at 5:00p.m two men approached another British tourist with a similar story.

An "ugly" blond-haired man was seen on 2 May across the road from 5A, apparently watching it; he had also been seen on 29 April near the Ocean Club. On 30 April the granddaughter of 5A's former owners saw a blond-haired man leaning against a wall behind the apartments, and saw him again on 2 May near the tapas restaurant, looking at 5A. She described him as Caucasian, mid-30s, with short cropped hair, and "ugly" with spots. On or before the day of the disappearance, a man was seen staring at the McCanns' block, where a white van was parked. In the late afternoon of 3 May, a girl on the balcony of the apartment above 5A saw a man leave through the gate below, as though he had come out of a ground-floor apartment; what caught her attention was that he looked around before shutting the gate quietly, with both hands. At 14:30 two blond-haired men were seen on the balcony of 5C, an empty apartment two doors from 5A. At 16:00–17:00 a blond-haired man was seen near 5A. At 18:00 the same or another blond-haired man was seen in the stairwell of the McCanns' block. At 23:00, after the disappearance, two blond-haired men were seen in a nearby street speaking in raised voices. When they realized they had been noticed, they reportedly lowered their voices and walked away.

McCanns as arguidos

Early suspicion

The first indication that the media were turning against the McCanns came on 6 June 2007, when a German journalist asked them during a Berlin press conference whether they were involved in the disappearance. On 30 June a 3,000-word article entitled "The Madeleine Case: A Pact of Silence" appeared in Sol, a Portuguese weekly, stating that the McCanns were suspects, highlighting alleged inconsistencies between their statements and implying that the Tanner sighting had been invented. The reporters had obtained the Tapas Sevens' mobile numbers and that of another witness, so it was apparent that the inquiry had a leak.

This and later articles in the Portuguese press, invariably followed up in the UK, made several allegations, based on no evidence, which would engulf the McCanns for years on social media. They included that the McCanns and Tapas Seven were "swingers", that the McCanns had been sedating their children, and that the group had formed a "pact of silence" regarding what had happened on the night of the disappearance. Much was made of apparent inconsistencies within and between the McCanns' and Tapas Seven's statements. The police had asked the group questions in Portuguese, and an interpreter had translated the replies. According to Kate, the statements were then typed up in Portuguese and verbally translated back into English for the interviewees to sign.

Among the inconsistencies was whether the McCanns had entered the apartment by the front or back door when checking on the children. According to the PJ case file, Gerry stated during his first interview, on 4 May 2007, that the couple had entered 5A through the locked front door for his 21:05 and her 22:00 checks, and in a second interview, on 10 May, that he had entered through the unlocked patio doors at the back. (The patio doors could be unlocked only from inside, so the parents had left them unlocked to let themselves in.) There was also an inconsistency about whether the front door had been locked. Gerry told The Sunday Times in December 2007 that they had used the front door earlier in the week, but it was next to the children's bedroom, so they had started using the patio doors instead. The PJ also questioned why, when Kate discovered Madeleine was missing, she had run to the tapas restaurant leaving the twins alone in 5A, when she could have used her mobile phone or shouted to the group from 5A's rear balcony.

Another issue was whether the exterior shutter over Madeleine's bedroom window could be opened from outside. According to journalist Danny Collins, the shutter was made of non-ferrous metal slats on a roller blind that was housed in a box at the top of the inside window, controlled by pulling on a strap. Once rolled down, the slats locked in place outside the window and could be raised only by using the strap on the inside. Kate said the shutter and window were closed when Madeleine was put to bed, but open when she discovered Madeleine was missing. Gerry told the PJ that, when he was first alerted to the disappearance, he had lowered the shutter, then had gone outside and discovered that it could be raised only from the outside. Against this, Portuguese police said the shutter could not be raised from the outside without being forced, but there was no sign of forced entry; they also said forcing the shutter open would have caused a lot of noise.

The apparent discrepancies contributed to the view of the PJ that there had been no abduction. Kate's shout of "they've taken her" was viewed with suspicion, as though she had been trying to lend credence to a false abduction story. Particularly from August onwards, these suspicions developed into the theory that Madeleine had died in apartment 5A as a result of an accident—perhaps after being sedated to help her stay asleep—and that her parents had hidden her body for a month, before retrieving her and driving her to an unknown place in a car they had hired over three weeks after the disappearance. In 2010, Carlos Anjos, former head of the Police Detectives Union in Portugal, told the BBC programme Panorama that most Portuguese investigators still believed Madeleine had died as a result of an accident in the apartment.

Portugal sends a letter rogatory 
On 28 June 2007, the McCanns suggested to the PJ that the police request help from Danie Krugel, a South African former police officer who had developed a "matter orientation system", a handheld device that he claimed could locate missing people using DNA and satellites. On hearing about this years later, one scientist said it had caused his "BS detector to go off the scale". Kate wrote in 2011 that Krugel's claims made no sense, but the couple were desperate. In the second week of June they sent Krugel hair and eyelashes from Madeleine collected from the McCann family home by relatives in the UK. Krugel arrived in Praia da Luz on 15 July and told the McCanns his equipment had picked up a "static signal" in an area of the beach near the Rocha Negra cliff.

The officer in charge of the PJ inquiry, Inspector Gonçalo Amaral, interpreted Kate's support of Krugel as a ploy. By this point he believed the McCanns were involved in the disappearance and that Kate was using Krugel—she had also considered using psychics—to "disclose the location of her daughter's body" without compromising herself. With this in mind, the PJ sent a letter rogatory to the British police to ask for assistance in their search for Madeleine's body.

In response, Mark Harrison, the national search adviser for the NPIA, arrived in Praia da Luz, walked around the search areas, and flew over them by helicopter. Describing Krugel's ideas as "highly unlikely", Harrison's report, dated 23 July 2007, said that 100 officers had searched up to  around Praia da Luz, but that the officer in charge and most of the team had no training in search procedures, with the exception of a search-and-rescue team from Lisbon. Search dogs had been used, but after five days instead of within two days as the handlers recommend. Harrison suggested searching the beach and shoreline, an open area near the village, Robert Murat's property, apartment 5A, the Tapas Seven's apartments, and any hired vehicles. He recommended using ground-penetrating radar and bringing in Keela and Eddie, two Springer spaniel sniffer dogs from South Yorkshire.

British sniffer dogs arrive
Keela was a forensic investigation dog trained to give her handler, Martin Grime, a "passive alert" to the scent of human blood by placing her nose close to the spot, then freezing in that position. Eddie was an enhanced-victim-recovery dog (EVRD, or cadaver dog) who gave a "bark alert" to the scent of human cadavers, including shortly after the death of the subject, even if the remains were buried, incinerated, or in water; he was trained to bark only in response to that scent and not for any other reason.

The dogs arrived in Praia da Luz on 31 July 2007 and were taken to apartment 5A, nearby wasteland, and the beach. Both dogs alerted behind the sofa in the living room of 5A, and Eddie gave an alert near the wardrobe in the main bedroom. There were no alerts on the beach or wasteland. The PJ obtained warrants to search the house the McCanns had rented on Rua das Flores, and the silver Renault Scénic the couple had hired 24 days after Madeleine went missing. The house and grounds were searched on 2 August. The only alert was from Eddie when he encountered Cuddle Cat, which was lying in the living room; Keela did not give an alert. The police left with boxes of the McCanns' clothes, Cuddle Cat, a pair of latex gloves, suitcases, a notepad, two diaries—including one that Kate had started after the disappearance—and a friend's Bible she had borrowed. A passage the Bible's owner had marked from 2 Samuel, about the death of a child, was copied into the police case file along with a Portuguese translation. The items were taken to another location, where Eddie alerted his handler to one of the boxes of clothes. A source close to the McCanns' lawyers told reporters that, if there was indeed a smell of corpses on Kate's clothes, it could have been caused by her contact with corpses as a family doctor.

The police removed the Renault and, on 6 August, Keela and Eddie were taken to an underground car park opposite the PJ headquarters in Portimão, where ten cars were parked, 20–30 feet apart, including the McCanns' and Murat's. Eddie, the cadaver dog, gave an alert outside the McCanns' car by the driver's door. The next morning Keela alerted to the rear driver's side inside the boot (trunk) and the map compartment in the driver's door, which contained the ignition key and key ring. When the key ring was hidden underneath sand in a fire bucket, she alerted again, as she did when the bucket was moved to a different floor of the car park. Almost immediately the Portuguese press began running stories that Madeleine had died inside apartment 5A.

British DNA analysis
Hair and other fibres were collected from areas in the car and apartment 5A where Keela and Eddie had given alerts, and were sent to the Forensic Science Service (FSS) in Birmingham for DNA profiling, arriving around 8 August 2007. At this point, according to The Sunday Times, the PJ "abandoned the abduction theory". On 8 August, without waiting for the results from Birmingham, Portuguese police called the McCanns to a meeting in Portimão, where Guilhermino Encarnação, PJ regional director, and Luis Neves, coordinator of the Direcção Central de Combate ao Banditismo in Lisbon, told them the case was now a murder inquiry. When Encarnação died of stomach cancer in 2010, The Daily Telegraph identified him as a major source of the leaks against the McCanns. Both the McCanns were interrogated that day; the officers suggested that Kate's memory was faulty.

The FSS used a technique known as low copy number (LCN) testing. Used when only a few cells are available, the test is controversial because it is vulnerable to contamination and misinterpretation. On 3 September, John Lowe of the FSS emailed Detective Superintendent Stuart Prior of the Leicestershire Police, the liaison officer between the British and Portuguese authorities. Lowe told Prior that a sample from the car boot contained fifteen out of nineteen of Madeleine's DNA components, and that the result was "too complex for meaningful interpretation":

A complex LCN [low copy number] DNA result which appeared to have originated from at least three people was obtained from cellular material recovered from the luggage compartment section ... Within the DNA profile of Madeleine McCann there are 20 DNA components represented by 19 peaks on a chart. ... Of these 19 components 15 are present within the result from this item; there are 37 components in total. There are 37 components because there are at least 3 contributors; but there could be up to five contributors. In my opinion therefore this result is too complex for meaningful interpretation/inclusion. ... [W]e cannot answer the question: Is the match genuine, or is it a chance match.

McCanns made arguidos
Lowe's email was translated into Portuguese on 4 September 2007. The next day, according to Kate, the PJ proposed that, if she were to admit that Madeleine had died in an accident in the apartment and that she had hidden the body, she might only serve a two-year sentence. Her husband would not be charged and would be free to leave. Both parents were given arguido status on 7 September, and were advised by their lawyer not to answer questions. The PJ told Gerry that Madeleine's DNA had been found in the car boot and behind the sofa in apartment 5A. Gerry did respond to questions, but Kate declined to reply to 48 questions she was asked during an eleven-hour interview.

The DNA evidence was a "100 percent match", journalists in Portugal were told. British tabloid headlines included "Corpse in McCann Car" (London Evening Standard, 16 October 2007), while the Daily Star reported that a "clump of Maddie's hair" had been found in the car. The leaks came directly from Portuguese police, according to testimony in 2012 from Jerry Lawton, a Daily Star reporter, to the Leveson Inquiry. Matt Baggott of the Leicestershire Police told the inquiry that, because the Portuguese were in charge of the case, he had made a decision not to correct reporters; his force's priority, he said, was to maintain a good relationship with the PJ with a view to finding Madeleine.

McCanns return to the UK, Almeida report
Despite their arguido status, the McCanns were allowed to leave Portugal, and on legal advice did so immediately, arriving back in England on 9 September 2007. The following day Chief Inspector Tavares de Almeida of the PJ in Portimão signed a nine-page report concluding that Madeleine had died in apartment 5A as a result of an accident, that the restaurant meal and apparent regular checks on the McCann children had been part of the cover-up, that the Tapas Seven had helped to mislead the police, and that the McCanns had concealed the child's body before faking an abduction. An eleven-page document from the Information Analysis Brigade in Lisbon analysed alleged discrepancies in the McCanns' statements. On 11 September the public prosecutor, José Cunha de Magalhães e Meneses, handed the ten-volume case file to a judge, Pedro Miguel dos Anjos Frias. Meneses applied for the seizure of Kate's diary and Gerry's laptop. The police also wanted to trace telephone calls between the McCanns and the Tapas Seven, and there were details in the report about the number of suitcases the McCanns and their friends had taken back to England.

On 28 September 2007, according to a diplomatic cable published by WikiLeaks in 2010, the United States ambassador to Portugal, Al Hoffman, wrote about a meeting he had had with the British ambassador to Portugal, Alexander Ellis, on 21 September 2007. The cable said: "Without delving into the details of the case, Ellis admitted that the British police had developed the current evidence against the McCann parents, and he stressed that authorities from both countries were working co-operatively. He commented that the media frenzy was to be expected and was acceptable as long as government officials keep their comments behind closed doors."

Control Risks, a British security company—paid by an anonymous donor to assist the McCanns since 7 May 2007—took hair samples from the McCann twins on 24 September 2007, at their parents' request. The twins had slept through the commotion in apartment 5A after Madeleine was reported missing; Kate wrote that she was concerned the abductor might have given the children sedatives. According to the PJ files, Kate had asked them to take samples, three months after the disappearance, but they had not done so. Control Risks took a sample from Kate too, to rebut allegations that she was on medication. No trace of drugs was found.

Gonçalo Amaral's removal, later developments
On 2 October 2007 Chief Inspector Gonçalo Amaral was removed from his post as the inquiry's coordinator and transferred to Faro after telling the newspaper Diário de Notícias that British police had only pursued leads helpful to the McCanns. As an example, he criticized their decision to follow up an anonymous email to Prince Charles that claimed a former Ocean Club employee had taken Madeleine.

Amaral was himself made an arguido one day after Madeleine's disappearance, in relation to his investigation of another case, the disappearance of Joana Cipriano. The following month he was charged with making a false statement, and four other officers were charged with assault. Eight-year-old Joana Cipriano had vanished in 2004 from Figueira, seven miles (11 km) from Praia da Luz. Her body was never found, and no murder weapon was identified. Cipriano's mother and uncle were convicted of her murder after confessing, but the mother retracted her confession, saying she had been beaten by police. Amaral was not present when the beating is alleged to have taken place, but he was accused of having covered up for others. The other detectives were acquitted. Amaral was convicted of perjury in May 2009 and received an eighteen-month suspended sentence.

The McCann inquiry was taken over by Paulo Rebelo, deputy national director of the PJ, which expanded its team of detectives and began a case review. On 29 November 2007 four members of the Portuguese inquiry, including Francisco Corte-Real, vice-president of Portugal's forensic crime service, were briefed at Leicestershire Police headquarters by the FSS. In April 2008 the Tapas Seven were interviewed in England by the Leicestershire Police, with the PJ in attendance. 

The PJ planned in December 2007 to hold a reconstruction in Praia da Luz, using the McCanns and Tapas Seven rather than actors, but the Tapas Seven declined to participate. The poor relationship between the McCanns and Portuguese police was evident again that month when, on the day the couple were at the European Parliament to promote a monitoring system for missing children, transcripts of their interviews with the PJ were leaked to Spanish television. The national director of the PJ, Alípio Ribeiro, resigned not long after this, citing media pressure; he had publicly said the police had been hasty in naming the McCanns as suspects.  Portuguese prosecutors were examining several charges against the McCanns, including child abandonment, abduction, homicide, and concealment of a corpse.

Inquiry closed (21 July 2008)
On 21 July 2008 the Portuguese Attorney General, Fernando José Pinto Monteiro, announced that there was no evidence to link the McCanns or Robert Murat to Madeleine's disappearance. Their arguido status was lifted and the case was closed. On 4 August, Portugal's Ministério Público released seventeen case files containing 11,233 pages on CD-ROM to the media, including 2,550 pages of sightings. The files included a 58-page prosecutors' report, which concluded: "No element of proof whatsoever was found which allows us to form any lucid, sensible, serious and honest conclusion about the circumstances." In 2009 Portugal released a further 2,000 pages. Days after the case closed, excerpts from Kate's diary, which had been taken by the PJ in August 2007, were published in translation by a Portuguese tabloid, Correio da Manhã, despite a Portuguese judge's ruling in June 2008 that the seizure had been a privacy violation and that any copies must be destroyed. On 14 September 2008, a News International tabloid, News of the World, published the extracts, again without permission and now improperly translated back into English.

Amaral's book (24 July 2008)
The lingering tensions between the McCanns and the PJ had reached such a height that Amaral resigned from the force in June 2008 to write a book alleging that Madeleine had died in an accident in the apartment and that, to cover it up, the McCanns had faked an abduction. Three days after the case closed, Amaral's book, Maddie: A Verdade da Mentira ("Maddie: The Truth of the Lie"), was published in Portugal by Guerra & Paz. By November 2008 it had sold 180,000 copies and by 2010 had been translated into six languages. A documentary based on the book was broadcast on TVI in Portugal in April 2009, watched by 2.2 million viewers.

The McCanns began a libel action against Amaral and his publisher in 2009. Madeleine's Fund covered the legal fees. In 2015 they were awarded over €600,000 in libel damages; Amaral's appeal against that decision succeeded in 2016. A judge had issued an injunction against further publication or sales of the book in 2009, but the Lisbon Court of Appeal overturned the ban in 2010, stating that it violated Amaral's freedom of expression. The ban was reinstated in 2015 as part of the libel ruling, then lifted when Amaral's appeal succeeded in 2016. The McCanns appealed the 2016 decision to Portugal's Supreme Court, but the court ruled against them in February 2017. In their 76-page ruling, the judges wrote that the McCanns had not, in fact, been cleared by the archiving of the criminal case in 2008. In March 2017, the Supreme Court rejected the McCanns' final appeal.

Madeleine's Fund inquiry (2007–2011)

Raising money
The McCanns set up Madeleine's Fund: Leaving No Stone Unturned Ltd on 15 May 2007, twelve days after the disappearance. Over 80 million people visited the fund's website in the three months after the disappearance. From September 2007, Brian Kennedy of Everest Windows supported the couple financially, and Kennedy's lawyer joined the fund's board of directors.  it had seven directors, including the McCanns.

Appeals by public figures were screened at football matches across the UK. Between May 2007 and March 2008, the fund received £1,846,178, including £1.4 million through the bank, £390,000 online, and £64,000 from merchandise. Donations included £250,000 from the News of the World, £250,000 from Sir Philip Green, $50,000 from Simon Cowell, and $25,000 from Coleen Rooney. J. K. Rowling and Richard Branson also made large donations; Branson donated £100,000 to the McCanns' legal fund. Madeleine's Fund did not cover the couple's legal costs arising from their status as arguidos, but it was criticized in October 2007 for having made two of the McCanns' mortgage payments, before they were made arguidos. A reward of £2.5 million was also offered, including from the News of the World, Rowling, Branson, Green, and a Scottish businessman, Stephen Winyard. 

In March 2008, Express Newspapers paid the fund £550,000 and £375,000 in libel damages arising out of articles about the McCanns and the Tapas Seven, respectively. In 2011, Kate McCann's book, Madeleine, was serialized by The Sunday Times and The Sun, both owned by News International, for a payment to the fund of £500,000 to £1 million. In December 2015, the fund stood at around £750,000.

Private investigators
Madeleine's Fund hired several firms of private investigators, causing friction with Portuguese police. Shortly after the disappearance, an anonymous benefactor paid for the services of a British security company, Control Risks. There had reportedly been four independent sightings from North Africa; Brian Kennedy went to Morocco himself in September 2007 to look into one. A Norwegian woman had reported seeing a girl matching Madeleine's description in a petrol station near Marrakesh, Morocco, on 9 May 2007; the child had reportedly asked the man she was with, in English, "Can we see Mummy soon?" When the witness returned home to Spain, she learned about the disappearance and telephoned the Spanish police. A month later, according to Kate, the police had still not formally interviewed the woman, which led the McCanns to fear that leads were not being pursued. The McCanns themselves travelled to Morocco on 10 June 2007 to raise awareness. They spent the night at the British ambassador's residence and were briefed by consular staff and a Metropolitan Police attaché.

Kennedy hired a Spanish agency, Método 3, for six months at £50,000 a month, which put 35 investigators on the case in Europe and Morocco. The relationship came to an end in part because the head of the agency made several public statements that concerned the McCanns, including to CBS that, "We know the kidnapper. We know who he is and how he has done it." Another private investigator was David Edgar, a retired detective inspector hired in 2009 on the recommendation of the head of Manchester's Serious Crime Squad. Edgar released an e-fit in August that year of a woman said to have asked two British men in Barcelona,  shortly after the disappearance, whether they were there to deliver her new daughter. Other private initiatives included a Portuguese lawyer financing the search of a reservoir near Praia da Luz in February 2008, and the use of ground radar by a South African property developer, Stephen Birch, who said in 2012 that scans showed there were bones beneath the driveway of a house in Praia da Luz.

Oakley International

In 2008, Madeleine's Fund hired Oakley International, a Washington, D.C.-registered detective agency, for over £500,000 for six months. Oakley sent a five-man team to Portugal led by Henri Exton, a former British police officer who had worked for MI5. The Oakley team engaged in undercover operations within the Ocean Club and among paedophile rings and the Roma community.

Exton questioned the significance of the Tanner sighting, and focused instead on the sighting by Martin and Mary Smith of a man carrying a child toward the beach. The Oakley team produced e-fits based on the Smiths' description. This was a sensitive issue, because Martin had recently watched BBC coverage of the McCanns's arrival in the UK from Portugal, at the height of public debate about their alleged involvement. As Gerry exited the aircraft with his son in his arms, Smith believed he recognized him as the man he had seen carrying the child in Praia da Luz. He reported his suspicion to the Leicestershire Police but later came to accept that he was mistaken: at 22:00 witnesses placed Gerry in the tapas restaurant. Nevertheless, publication of the Smith e-fits, which bore some resemblance to Gerry, would have fed the conspiracy theories about the McCanns.

Exton submitted his report to Madeleine's Fund in November 2008 and suggested releasing the e-fits, but the fund told Exton that the report and its e-fits had to remain confidential. The relationship between the company and the fund had soured, in part because of a dispute over fees, and in part because the report was critical of the McCanns and their friends: it suggested that Madeleine may have died in an accident after letting herself out of the apartment through its unlocked patio doors. Madeleine's Fund passed the e-fits to the police—the PJ and the Leicestershire Police had them by October 2009, and Scotland Yard received them when they became involved in August 2011—but did not otherwise release them. Kate did not include them with the other images of suspects in her book, Madeleine (2011), although she suggested that both the Tanner and Smith sightings were crucial. 

Scotland Yard released the e-fits in October 2013 for a BBC Crimewatch reconstruction. After it had aired, The Sunday Times published that the McCanns had had the e-fits since 2008. In response, the couple complained that the Sunday Times story implied (wrongly) that they had not only failed to publish the e-fits but had withheld them from the police. The newspaper published an apology on an inside page in December 2013. The McCanns subsequently sued and received £55,000 in damages, which Gerry said would be donated to charity.

Further police inquiries (2011–present)

Gamble report

The McCanns met the British Home Secretary Alan Johnson in 2009 to request a review of the case. Johnson commissioned a scoping report from Jim Gamble of CEOP. By March 2010, the Home Office had begun discussions with the Association of Chief Police Officers (ACPO) about setting up a British inquiry.

Delivered in May 2010, the Gamble report examined how several British agencies had become involved in the search for Madeleine, including CEOP itself, the Leicestershire Police, the Metropolitan Police Service, SOCA, the NPIA, Crimestoppers, the Home Office, Foreign Office, and 10 Downing Street. Gamble criticized the lack of coordination; everyone had wanted to help, and some had wanted "to be seen to help", he wrote, which had "created a sense of chaos and a sense of competition" hampering the inquiry by causing resentment among the Portuguese police. He recommended renewed cooperation between the British and Portuguese authorities; that all relevant information be exchanged between the police forces; that police perform an analysis of telephone calls made on the night of the disappearance; and that all leads be pursued, including those developed by private detectives.

Operation Grange

In May 2011, under Home Secretary Theresa May, Scotland Yard launched an investigative review, Operation Grange, with a team of 29 detectives and eight civilians. The announcement of the review appeared to have been triggered by a News International campaign by way of The Sun. The issue of whether this request was the result of "threats" or "persuasion" from News International chief executive Rebekah Brooks was one of the issues raised at the Leveson Inquiry.

On 11 May 2011, as it was serializing Kate's book, Madeleine, the front page of The Sun hosted an open letter from the McCanns in which they asked Prime Minister David Cameron to set up a new inquiry; 20,000 people signed the newspaper's petition that day. On the same day, according to her testimony to the Leveson Inquiry, May spoke by telephone, at her instigation, to Brooks and Dominic Mohan, editor of The Sun. The next day she wrote to the commissioner of the Metropolitan Police, Sir Paul Stephenson, to say that Portuguese police had agreed to cooperate with a British inquiry. Within 24 hours, Cameron made the announcement about Operation Grange, to be financed by a Home Office contingency fund.

Operation Grange was led by Commander Simon Foy. Detective Chief Inspector Andy Redwood of Scotland Yard's Homicide and Serious Crime Command was the first senior investigating officer, reporting to Detective Chief Superintendent Hamish Campbell. The team consisted of three detective inspectors, five detective sergeants, nineteen detective constables, and around six civilian staff. By July 2013 the review had become an investigation. When Redwood retired in 2014, he was replaced by DCI Nicola Wall.

The team had tens of thousands of documents translated, released an age-progressed image, and investigated over 8,000 potential sightings. By 2015 they had taken 1,338 statements, collected 1,027 exhibits, and investigated 650 sex offenders and 60 persons of interest. The inquiry was scaled back in October 2015 and the number of officers reduced to four. The Home Secretary approved an additional £95,000 of funding in April 2016 for what the Metropolitan Police Commissioner, Sir Bernard Hogan-Howe, said was one remaining line of inquiry. Another £85,000 was approved to cover up to September 2017; and £150,000 to cover until 31 March 2019, taking the cost of the inquiry to £11.75 million. The Home Office said it would approve similar funding for 2019.

Funding
In September 2018, the Home Office announced: "We have received and are considering a request from the Metropolitan Police Service to extend funding for Operation Grange until the end of March 2019". Up to that month, Operation Grange had cost £11.6m. In November 2018, an extra £150,000 is granted to continue the investigation, the latest in a series of six-month extensions which took the cost of Operation Grange to an estimated £11.75m. June 2019, the British government said it would fund Operation Grange until March 2020.

Theories: Planned abduction, burglary, wandered off
DCI Redwood made clear that Operation Grange was looking at a "criminal act by a stranger", most likely a planned abduction or a burglary that Madeleine had disturbed. There had been a fourfold increase in local burglaries between January and May 2007, including two in the McCanns' block in the seventeen days before the disappearance, during which intruders had entered through windows. In an interview in April 2017, just before the tenth anniversary of the disappearance, Scotland Yard's Assistant Commissioner, Mark Rowley, appeared to dismiss the burglary hypothesis, while adding that it was "not entirely ruled out". Referring to the suspects who might have been involved in burglaries in the area, he said that police had "pretty much closed off that group of people". The remaining detectives were focusing on a small number of inquiries that they believed were significant. Also that month there were claims that Scotland Yard was looking for a woman seen near 5A at the time of the disappearance.

Redwood said in 2013 that, "on one reading of the evidence", the disappearance did look like a pre-planned abduction, which "undoubtedly would have involved reconnaissance". Several witnesses described men hanging around near apartment 5A in the days before the disappearance and on the day itself. In May 2013, Scotland Yard wanted to trace twelve manual workers who were at the Ocean Club when Madeleine disappeared, including six British cleaners in a white van who were offering their services to British expats. In October 2013 Scotland Yard and Crimewatch staged a reconstruction—broadcast in the UK, the Netherlands and Germany—during which they released e-fits of the men seen near 5A and of the Smith sighting. Days after Crimewatch aired, Portugal's attorney general reopened the Portuguese inquiry, citing new evidence.

Another theory is that Madeleine, nearly four at the time, left the apartment by herself, perhaps to look for her parents, and was abducted by a passerby or fell into one of the open construction sites nearby. This is widely regarded as unlikely. According to her mother, Madeleine would have had to open the unlocked patio doors, close the curtains behind her, close the door again, open and close the child gate at the top of the stairs, then open and close the gate leading to the street.

Tracking mobile phone calls
Using mobile-phone tracking techniques, and with the cooperation of over thirty countries, police traced who had used cell phones near the scene of Madeleine's disappearance within the important time frame. The analysis turned up several calls and texts near the Ocean Club between a 30-year-old former Ocean Club bus driver, and his 24-year-old and 53-year-old associates. Detectives interviewed them in June 2014; they denied any connection to the disappearance. Police also found that the cell phone of Euclides Monteiro, a former Ocean Club restaurant worker who had previously been fired for theft, had been used near the resort that night. Originally from Cape Verde, Monteiro died in 2009 in a tractor accident. The suspicion was that he had been breaking into apartments to finance a drug habit; his widow said he had been questioned previously about break-ins involving the sexual assault of children but had been cleared by DNA evidence.

Holiday-home sexual assaults
Scotland Yard issued another appeal in March 2014 for information about a man who had entered holiday homes occupied by British families in four incidents in the western region of Algarve between 2004 and 2006, two of them in Praia da Luz. On those occasions he had sexually assaulted five girls, aged 7–10, in their beds. The man spoke English with a foreign accent and his speech was slow and perhaps slurred. He had short, dark, unkempt hair, tanned skin, and in the view of three victims a distinctive smell; he may have worn a long-sleeved burgundy top, perhaps with a white circle on the back. These were among twelve incidents reported in the area between 2004 and 2010. The PJ reportedly believed the intruder in the four incidents between 2004 and 2006 was Monteiro.

Searches and interviews in Praia da Luz
Nothing was found. The following month, at Scotland Yard's request, the PJ in Faro interviewed four Portuguese citizens, with Scotland Yard in attendance. No evidence was found to implicate them. One man, an associate of Robert Murat, was first questioned shortly after the disappearance. Pedro do Carmo, deputy director of the PJ, told the BBC that the interviews had been conducted only because Scotland Yard had requested them. 

Eleven people, including three Britons, were interviewed in December 2014. According to Portuguese media, Scotland Yard compiled 253 questions for the interviewees, including, "Did you kill Madeleine?" and, "Where did you hide the body?" Robert Murat, his wife, and her ex-husband were questioned, as were the former Ocean Club bus driver and his two associates who had telephoned or texted each other near the Ocean Club around the time of the disappearance. They admitted to having broken into Ocean Club apartments but denied having taken Madeleine.

German investigations in 2020
In June 2020, the public prosecutor of the German city Braunschweig ordered an inquiry regarding the possible involvement of then-43-year-old Christian Brückner (also known simply as “Christian B” under German privacy laws), a convicted sex offender believed to have been living in a borrowed VW camper van in the Algarve region at the time of Madeleine's disappearance. A British woman, who was Brückner's girlfriend at the time, reported that he told her the night before the abduction: "I have a job to do in Praia da Luz tomorrow. It’s a horrible job but it's something I have to do and it will change my life. You won't be seeing me for a while." Brückner's car, a Jaguar XJR6, was registered to a new owner the day after Madeleine disappeared. Hans Christian Wolters, from the public prosecutor's office, stated that they were starting proceedings under the presumption that Madeleine is dead, due to Brückner’s criminal record. Brückner has previously been convicted of unrelated counts of child sexual abuse and drug trafficking, and as of 2019 is serving a prison sentence in Germany for raping a 72-year-old American pensioner in the Algarve region; he is scheduled for release in September 2025.

On 3 June 2020, the German Federal Criminal Police Office made a public appeal for information relating to the McCann case on Aktenzeichen XY… ungelöst, a crime programme broadcast by the public television station ZDF. German police stated that they received useful information in 2013 after the case was first featured on Aktenzeichen XY, but that it took years to find substantial evidence for prosecution, and that they still need more information. The prosecutors asked the public for information about Brückner's phone number and a number that dialled him on the day of the disappearance, with which Brückner's number had a 30-minute connection.

On 27 July 2020, German police began searching an allotment in Hanover in connection with the investigation. In October 2021, the Mirror reported that Wolters had become convinced that Brückner abducted and murdered Madeleine.

Other inquiries
In the early days of the inquiry, Portuguese police searched through images seized from paedophile investigations, and Madeleine's parents were shown photographs of sex offenders in case they recognized them from Praia de Luz. Several British paedophiles were of interest. In May 2009, investigators working for the McCanns tried to question one, Raymond Hewlett; he had allegedly told someone he knew what happened to Madeleine, but he retracted his statement and died of cancer in Germany in December of that year. Scotland Yard made inquiries about two paedophiles who had been in jail in Scotland for murder since 2010; the men had been running a window-cleaning service in the Canary Islands when Madeleine went missing.

Another focus of Operation Grange was Urs Hans von Aesch, a deceased Swiss man implicated in the 2007 murder, in Switzerland, of five-year-old Ylenia Lenhard. Ylenia disappeared on 31 July 2007, nearly three months after Madeleine, and was found dead in September as a result of toluene poisoning. Von Aesch was living in Spain when Madeleine disappeared. In June 2016, Operation Grange officers interviewed an alleged victim of the deceased broadcaster Clement Freud, who was accused that year of having a history of child sexual abuse. Freud had had a home in Praia da Luz and had befriended the McCanns in July 2007, several weeks after the disappearance. Freud's family said he had been in the UK when Madeleine went missing.

2023 claims 
In February 2023, a Polish woman, Julia Wendel, came forward, stating that she believed she might be McCann, and offering to undergo DNA testing. Her claim was disputed by the Polish police.

Tabloids and social media

"Trial by media"
Eilis O'Hanlon wrote that the disappearance "could almost stand as a metaphor for the rise of social media as the predominant mode of public discourse". Twitter, one year old when Madeleine McCann went missing, became the source of much of the vitriol. Ten years later, the "#McCann" hashtag was still producing over 100 tweets an hour, according to researchers at the University of Huddersfield. Social media's attacks included a threat to kidnap one of the McCanns' twins, and when Scotland Yard and Crimewatch staged their reconstruction in 2013, there was apparently talk of phoning in with false information to sabotage the appeal. One man who ran an anti-McCann website received a three-month suspended sentence in 2013 after leafleting their village with his allegations. The following year a Twitter user was found dead from a helium overdose after Sky News confronted her about her 400 anti-McCann tweets.

The couple's status as photogenic, articulate, and professional was at first beneficial. Offers of help came in from across the United Kingdom, including 10 Downing Street. The McCanns took full advantage of the interest by hiring public relations consultants and offering regular events to sustain media interest. However the frenzy eventually turned against the couple, and there began what PR consultant Michael Cole called the "monstering of the McCanns". They were harshly criticized for having left their children alone in an unlocked apartment, despite the availability of Ocean Club babysitters and a crèche; the argument ran that a working-class couple would have faced child abandonment charges. Seventeen thousand people signed an online petition in June 2007 asking Leicestershire Social Services to investigate how the children came to be left unattended.

Kate's appearance and demeanour were widely discussed, with much of the commentary coming from other women, including Booker Prize-winner Anne Enright in the London Review of Books. Kate was deemed cold and controlled, too attractive, too thin, too well-dressed, or too intense. She had apparently been advised by abduction experts not to cry on camera because the kidnapper might enjoy her distress, and this led to more criticism: the Portuguese tabloid Correio da Manhã cited sources complaining that she had not "shed a single tear". Journalism professor Nicola Goc argued that Kate had joined a long list of mothers deemed killers because of unacceptable maternal behaviour. Commentators compared her experience to that of Lindy Chamberlain, convicted of murder after her baby was killed by a dingo. Like Kate, she was suspected, in part, because she had not wept in public. There was even a similar (false) story about supposedly relevant Bible passages the women were said to have highlighted. Chamberlain asked: "How can you apologise to me and do this again to someone else?"

In November 2011, the McCanns testified before the Leveson Inquiry into British press standards. The inquiry heard that Peter Hill, the editor of the Daily Express, in particular, had become "obsessed" with the couple. Express headlines included that Madeleine McCann had been "killed by sleeping pills", "Find body or McCanns will escape", and McCanns or a friend must be to blame, the latter based on an interview with a waiter. "Maddie 'Sold' By Hard-Up McCanns" ran a headline in the Daily Star, part of the Express group. Lord Justice Leveson called the articles "complete piffle". Roy Greenslade described them as "no journalistic accident, but a sustained campaign of vitriol against a grief-stricken family".

Libel actions
In addition to their legal efforts against Gonçalo Amaral and his publisher, the McCanns and Tapas Seven brought libel actions against several newspapers. The Daily Express, Daily Star and their sister Sunday papers, owned by Northern & Shell, published front-page apologies in 2008 and donated £550,000 to Madeleine's Fund. The Tapas Seven were awarded £375,000 against the Express group, also donated to Madeleine's Fund, along with an apology in the Daily Express. The McCanns received £55,000 from The Sunday Times in 2013 when the newspaper implied that they had withheld e-fits from the police.

Robert Murat received £600,000 in out-of-court settlements for libel in relation to 100 articles published by eleven newspapers—The Sun and News of the World (News International), Daily Express, Sunday Express and Daily Star (Northern & Shell), London Evening Standard, Daily Mail and Metro (Associated Newspapers), Daily Mirror, Sunday Mirror and Daily Record (Mirror Group Newspapers). According to The Observer, it was the largest number of separate libel actions brought in the UK by the same person in relation to one issue. His two associates were each awarded $100,000, and all three received public apologies. The British Sky Broadcasting Group, which owns Sky News, paid Murat undisclosed damages in 2008 and agreed that Sky News would host an apology on its website for twelve months.

Netflix documentary (2019)

Netflix released an eight-part documentary series, The Disappearance of Madeleine McCann, on 15 March 2019. Interviewees included Jim Gamble, former head of CEOP; Alan Johnson, former British home secretary; Brian Kennedy, the British businessman who supported the McCanns financially; Justine McGuiness, the McCanns' former spokesperson; Gonçalo Amaral, former head of the PJ investigation; Robert Murat, the first arguido; Julian Peribañez, a former Método 3 private investigator; Sandra Felgueiras, a Portuguese journalist who covered the disappearance; and Anthony Summers and Robbyn Swan, authors of Looking for Madeleine (2014).

See also 
 List of people who disappeared
 Reactions to the disappearance of Madeleine McCann
 Reported sightings of Madeleine McCann
 Disappearance of Suzy Lamplugh – previously Britain and the world's biggest ever missing person's inquiry

Notes

References

Works cited 
News sources are listed in the References section only.

External links 

 Find Madeleine, investigation@findmadeleine.com
 Operation Grange (Scotland Yard), operation.grange@met.police.uk
 Kate and Gerry McCann's testimony, Leveson Inquiry, 23 November 2011 (video); YouTube, part 1/3, 2/3, 3/3.
 

 
2007 crimes in Portugal
2000s missing person cases
Kidnapped English children
History of the Algarve
Kidnappings in Portugal
May 2007 crimes
May 2007 events in Europe
Missing English children
Missing person cases in Portugal
Portugal–United Kingdom relations
Possibly living people
Unsolved crimes in Portugal